Louisiana was admitted to the Union on April 30, 1812, and elects senators to Class 2 and Class 3. Its current senators are Republicans Bill Cassidy and John Kennedy.

List of senators 

|- style="height:2em"
| colspan=3 | Vacant
| Apr 30, 1812 –Sep 3, 1812
| Louisiana did not elect its senators until four months after statehood.
| rowspan=7 | 1
| rowspan=5 
| rowspan=5 | 1
| Louisiana did not elect its senators until four months after statehood.
| Apr 30, 1812 –Sep 3, 1812
| colspan=3 | Vacant

|- style="height:2em"
! 1
| align=left | Jean Noël Destréhan
|  | Democratic-Republican
| nowrap | Sep 3, 1812 –Oct 1, 1812
| Resigned
| rowspan=4 | Elected in 1812.
| rowspan=4 nowrap | Sep 3, 1812 –Mar 3, 1813
| rowspan=4  | Democratic-Republican
| rowspan=4 align=right | Allan B. Magruder
! rowspan=4 | 1

|- style="height:2em"
| colspan=3 | Vacant
| nowrap | Oct 1, 1812 –Oct 8, 1812
|  

|- style="height:2em"
! 2
| align=left | Thomas Posey
|  | Democratic-Republican
| nowrap | Oct 8, 1812 –Feb 4, 1813
| Appointed to continue Destréhan's term.Lost election to finish Destréhan's term.

|- style="height:2em"
! rowspan=3 | 3
| rowspan=3 align=left | James Brown
| rowspan=3  | Democratic-Republican
| rowspan=3 nowrap | Feb 5, 1813 –Mar 3, 1817
| rowspan=3 | Elected to finish Destréhan's term.Lost election to full term.

|- style="height:2em"
| 
| rowspan=5 | 2
| rowspan=5 | Elected in 1813Retired.
| rowspan=5 nowrap | Mar 4, 1813 –Mar 3, 1819
| rowspan=5  | Democratic-Republican
| rowspan=5 align=right | Eligius Fromentin
! rowspan=5 | 2

|- style="height:2em"
| 

|- style="height:2em"
! 4
| align=left | William C. C. Claiborne
|  | Democratic-Republican
| nowrap | Mar 4, 1817 –Nov 23, 1817
| Elected in 1817.Died.
| rowspan=5 | 2
| rowspan=3 

|- style="height:2em"
| colspan=3 | Vacant
| nowrap | Nov 23, 1817 –Jan 12, 1818
|  

|- style="height:2em"
! rowspan=6 | 5
| rowspan=6 align=left | Henry Johnson
| rowspan=6  | Democratic-Republican
| rowspan=6 nowrap | Jan 12, 1818 –May 27, 1824
| rowspan=3 | Elected to finish Claiborne's term.

|- style="height:2em"
| 
| rowspan=7 | 3
| rowspan=3 | Elected in 1819.Resigned to become U.S. Minister to France.
| rowspan=3 nowrap | Mar 4, 1819 –Dec 10, 1823
| rowspan=3  | Democratic-Republican
| rowspan=3 align=right | James Brown
! rowspan=3 | 3

|- style="height:2em"
| 

|- style="height:2em"
| rowspan=3 | Elected to full term in 1823.Resigned to become Governor of Louisiana.
| rowspan=7 | 3
| rowspan=5 

|- style="height:2em"
|  
| nowrap | Dec 10, 1823 –Jan 15, 1824
| colspan=3 | Vacant

|- style="height:2em"
| rowspan=3 | Elected to finish Brown's term.
| rowspan=10 nowrap | Jan 15, 1824 –May 19, 1833
| rowspan=3  | Democratic-Republican
| rowspan=10 align=right | Josiah S. Johnston
! rowspan=10 | 4

|- style="height:2em"
| colspan=3 | Vacant
| nowrap | May 27, 1824 –Nov 19, 1824
|  

|- style="height:2em"
! rowspan=3 | 6
| rowspan=3 align=left | Charles D. J. Bouligny
|  | Democratic-Republican
| rowspan=3 nowrap | Nov 19, 1824 –Mar 3, 1829
| rowspan=3 | Elected to finish Johnson's term.

|- style="height:2em"
| rowspan=2  | NationalRepublican
| 
| rowspan=3 | 4
| rowspan=3 | Elected to full term in 1825.
| rowspan=7  | NationalRepublican

|- style="height:2em"
| 

|- style="height:2em"
! rowspan=2 | 7
| rowspan=2 align=left | Edward Livingston
| rowspan=2  | Jacksonian
| rowspan=2 nowrap | Mar 4, 1829 –May 24, 1831
| rowspan=2 | Elected in 1829.Resigned to become U.S. Secretary of State.
| rowspan=7 | 4
| 

|- style="height:2em"
| rowspan=3 
| rowspan=10 | 5
| rowspan=4 | Re-elected in 1831.Died.

|- style="height:2em"
| colspan=3 | Vacant
| nowrap | May 24, 1831 –Nov 15, 1831
|  

|- style="height:2em"
! rowspan=4 | 8
| rowspan=4 align=left | George A. Waggaman
| rowspan=4  | NationalRepublican
| rowspan=4 nowrap | Nov 15, 1831 –Mar 3, 1835
| rowspan=4 | Elected to finish Livingston's term.

|- style="height:2em"
| rowspan=3 

|- style="height:2em"
|  
| nowrap | May 19, 1833 –Dec 19, 1833
| colspan=3 | Vacant

|- style="height:2em"
| rowspan=3 | Elected to finish Johnston's term.Resigned due to ill health.
| rowspan=3 nowrap | Dec 19, 1833 –Jan 5, 1837
| rowspan=3  | NationalRepublican
| rowspan=3 align=right | Alexander Porter
! rowspan=3 | 5

|- style="height:2em"
| colspan=3 | Vacant
| nowrap | Mar 4, 1835 –Jan 13, 1836
| Charles Gayarré (J) was elected in 1835, but resigned due to ill health.
| rowspan=6 | 5
| rowspan=4 

|- style="height:2em"
! rowspan=5 | 9
| rowspan=5 align=left | Robert C. Nicholas
| rowspan=3  | Jacksonian
| rowspan=5 nowrap | Jan 13, 1836 –Mar 3, 1841
| rowspan=5 | Elected to finish Gauarré's term.

|- style="height:2em"
|  
| nowrap | Jan 5, 1837 –Jan 12, 1837
| colspan=3 | Vacant

|- style="height:2em"
| Elected to finish Porter's term.
| rowspan=4 nowrap | Jan 12, 1837 –Mar 1, 1842
|  | Jacksonian
| rowspan=4 align=right | Alexandre Mouton
! rowspan=4 | 6

|- style="height:2em"
| rowspan=2  | Democratic
| 
| rowspan=5 | 6
| rowspan=3 | Re-elected in 1837.Resigned.
| rowspan=3  | Democratic

|- style="height:2em"
| 

|- style="height:2em"
! rowspan=7 | 10
| rowspan=7 align=left | Alexander Barrow
| rowspan=7  | Whig
| rowspan=7 nowrap | Mar 4, 1841 –Dec 29, 1846
| rowspan=7 | Elected in 1840.Died.
| rowspan=9 | 6
| 

|- style="height:2em"
|  
| nowrap | Mar 1, 1842 –Apr 14, 1842
| colspan=3 | Vacant

|- style="height:2em"
| Appointed to finish Mouton's term.Lost election to full term.
| nowrap | Apr 14, 1842 –Mar 3, 1843
|  | Whig
| align=right | Charles Magill Conrad
! 7

|- style="height:2em"
| 
| rowspan=7 | 7
| Elected in 1843, but due to ill health did not take his seat.Died.
| nowrap | Mar 4, 1843 –Jan 13, 1844
|  | Whig
| align=right | Alexander Porter
! 8

|-
|  
| nowrap | Jan 13, 1844 –Feb 12, 1844
| colspan=3 | Vacant

|- style="height:2em"
| rowspan=5 |Elected to finish Porter's termLost election to full term in 1849.
| rowspan=5 nowrap | Feb 12, 1844 –Mar 3, 1849
| rowspan=5  | Whig
| rowspan=5 align=right | Henry Johnson
! rowspan=5 | 9

|- style="height:2em"
| rowspan=3 

|- style="height:2em"
| colspan=3 | Vacant
| nowrap | Dec 29, 1846 –Jan 21, 1847
|  

|- style="height:2em"
! 11
| align=left | Pierre Soulé
|  | Democratic
| nowrap | Jan 21, 1847 –Mar 3, 1847
| Elected to finish Barrow's term.

|- style="height:2em"
! rowspan=3 | 12
| rowspan=3 align=left | Solomon W. Downs
| rowspan=3  | Democratic
| rowspan=3 nowrap | Mar 4, 1847 –Mar 3, 1853
| rowspan=3 | Elected in 1847.Lost re-election.
| rowspan=3 | 7
| 

|- style="height:2em"
| 
| rowspan=5 | 8
| rowspan=3 | Elected in 1848.Resigned to become U.S. Minister to Spain.
| rowspan=3 nowrap | Mar 3, 1849 –Apr 11, 1853
| rowspan=3  | Democratic
| rowspan=3 align=right | Pierre Soulé
! rowspan=3 | 10

|- style="height:2em"
| 

|- style="height:2em"
! rowspan=6 | 13
| rowspan=6 align=left | Judah P. Benjamin
| rowspan=4  | Whig
| rowspan=6 nowrap | Mar 4, 1853 –Feb 4, 1861
| rowspan=5 | Elected in 1852.
| rowspan=5 | 8
| rowspan=3 

|- style="height:2em"
|  
| nowrap | Apr 11, 1853 –Dec 5, 1853
| colspan=3 | Vacant

|- style="height:2em"
| Elected to finish Soulé's term.
| rowspan=4 nowrap | Dec 5, 1853 –Feb 4, 1861
| rowspan=4  | Democratic
| rowspan=4 align=right | John Slidell
! rowspan=4 | 11

|- style="height:2em"
| 
| rowspan=4 | 9
| rowspan=3 | Re-election year unknown.Resigned.

|- style="height:2em"
| rowspan=2  | Democratic
| 

|- style="height:2em"
| Re-elected in 1859.Withdrew.
| rowspan=4 | 9
| rowspan=2 

|- style="height:2em"
| rowspan=5 colspan=3 | Vacant
| rowspan=5 nowrap | Feb 4, 1861 –Jul 8, 1868
| rowspan=5 | Civil War and Reconstruction
| rowspan=6 | Civil War and Reconstruction
| rowspan=6 nowrap | Feb 4, 1861 –Jul 9, 1868
| rowspan=6 colspan=3 | Vacant

|- style="height:2em"
| 
| rowspan=3 | 10

|- style="height:2em"
| 

|- style="height:2em"
| rowspan=5 | 10
| 

|- style="height:2em"
| rowspan=3 
| rowspan=6 | 11

|- style="height:2em"
! rowspan=3 | 14
| rowspan=3 align=left | John S. Harris
| rowspan=3  | Republican
| rowspan=3 nowrap | Jul 8, 1868 –Mar 3, 1871
| rowspan=3 | Elected to finish incomplete term in 1868..

|- style="height:2em"
| rowspan=3 | Elected to finish incomplete term.Resigned to become Governor of Louisiana.
| rowspan=3 nowrap | Jul 9, 1868 –Nov 1, 1872
| rowspan=3  | Republican
| rowspan=3 align=right | William Pitt Kellogg
! rowspan=3 | 12

|- style="height:2em"
| 

|- style="height:2em"
! rowspan=5 | 15
| rowspan=5 align=left | Joseph R. West
| rowspan=5  | Republican
| rowspan=5 nowrap | Mar 4, 1871 –Mar 3, 1877
| rowspan=5 | Election year unknown.Retired.
| rowspan=5 | 11
| rowspan=2 

|- style="height:2em"
| rowspan=3 | Senate declined to seat rival claimants William L. McMillen and P. B. S. Pinchback
| rowspan=3 nowrap | Nov 1, 1872 –Jan 12, 1876
| rowspan=3 colspan=3 | Vacant

|- style="height:2em"
| 
| rowspan=4 | 12

|- style="height:2em"
| rowspan=2 

|- style="height:2em"
| rowspan=2 | Elected to finish incomplete term in 1876.Lost re-election.
| rowspan=2 nowrap | Jan 12, 1876 –Mar 3, 1879
| rowspan=2  | Democratic
| rowspan=2 align=right | James B. Eustis
! rowspan=2 | 13

|- style="height:2em"
! rowspan=3 | 16
| rowspan=3 align=left | William Pitt Kellogg
| rowspan=3  | Republican
| rowspan=3 nowrap | Mar 4, 1877 –Mar 3, 1883
| rowspan=3 | Elected in 1876.Retired to run for U.S. House.
| rowspan=3 | 12
| 

|- style="height:2em"
| 
| rowspan=3 | 13
| rowspan=3 | Elected in 1879.Lost re-election.
| rowspan=3 nowrap | Mar 4, 1879 –Mar 3, 1885
| rowspan=3  | Democratic
| rowspan=3 align=right | Benjamin F. Jonas
! rowspan=3 | 14

|- style="height:2em"
| 

|- style="height:2em"
! rowspan=5 | 17
| rowspan=5 align=left | Randall L. Gibson
| rowspan=5  | Democratic
| rowspan=5 nowrap | Mar 4, 1883 –Dec 15, 1892
| rowspan=3 | Elected in 1882.
| rowspan=3 | 13
| 

|- style="height:2em"
| 
| rowspan=3 | 14
| rowspan=3 | Election year unknown.Retired.
| rowspan=3 nowrap | Mar 4, 1885 –Mar 3, 1891
| rowspan=3  | Democratic
| rowspan=3 align=right | James B. Eustis
! rowspan=3 | 15

|- style="height:2em"
| 

|- style="height:2em"
| rowspan=2 | Re-elected in 1889.Died.
| rowspan=6 | 14
| 

|- style="height:2em"
| rowspan=3 
| rowspan=6 | 15
| rowspan=4 | Elected in 1891.Resigned to become U.S. Supreme Court Justice.
| rowspan=4 nowrap | Mar 4, 1891 –Mar 12, 1894
| rowspan=4  | Democratic
| rowspan=4 align=right | Edward Douglass White
! rowspan=4 | 16

|- style="height:2em"
| colspan=3 | Vacant
| nowrap | Dec 15, 1892 –Dec 31, 1892
|  

|- style="height:2em"
! rowspan=6 | 18
| rowspan=6 align=left | Donelson Caffery
| rowspan=6  | Democratic
| rowspan=6 nowrap | Dec 31, 1892 –Mar 3, 1901
| rowspan=3 | Appointed to continue Gibson's term.Elected in 1894 to finish Gibson's term.

|- style="height:2em"
| rowspan=2 

|- style="height:2em"
| rowspan=2 | Appointed to continue White's term.Elected in 1894 to finish White's term.Retired.
| rowspan=2 nowrap | Mar 12, 1894 –Mar 3, 1897
| rowspan=2  | Democratic
| rowspan=2 align=right | Newton C. Blanchard
! rowspan=2 | 17

|- style="height:2em"
| rowspan=3 | Elected in 1894 to the next term, before election to finish Gibson's term.Retired.
| rowspan=3 | 15
| 

|- style="height:2em"
| 
| rowspan=3 | 16
| rowspan=3 | Elected in 1896.
| rowspan=7 nowrap | Mar 4, 1897 –Jun 28, 1910
| rowspan=7  | Democratic
| rowspan=7 align=right | Samuel D. McEnery
! rowspan=7 | 18

|- style="height:2em"
| 

|- style="height:2em"
! rowspan=8 | 19
| rowspan=8 align=left | Murphy J. Foster
| rowspan=8  | Democratic
| rowspan=8 nowrap | Mar 4, 1901 –Mar 3, 1913
| rowspan=3 | Elected in 1900.
| rowspan=3 | 16
| 

|- style="height:2em"
| 
| rowspan=3 | 17
| rowspan=3 | Re-elected early in 1900.

|- style="height:2em"
| 

|- style="height:2em"
| rowspan=5 | Re-elected early in 1904.Lost renomination.
| rowspan=5 | 17
| 

|- style="height:2em"
| rowspan=3 
| rowspan=5 | 18
| Re-elected in 1908.Died.

|- style="height:2em"
|  
| nowrap | Jun 28, 1910 –Dec 7, 1910
| colspan=3 | Vacant

|- style="height:2em"
| rowspan=3 |Elected to finish McEnery's term.Retired.
| rowspan=3 nowrap | Dec 7, 1910 –Mar 3, 1915
| rowspan=3  | Democratic
| rowspan=3 align=right | John Thornton
! rowspan=3 | 19

|- style="height:2em"
| 

|- style="height:2em"
! rowspan=12 | 20
| rowspan=12 align=left | Joseph E. Ransdell
| rowspan=12  | Democratic
| rowspan=12 nowrap | Mar 4, 1913 –Mar 3, 1931
| rowspan=6 | Elected in 1912.
| rowspan=6 | 18
| 

|- style="height:2em"
| 
| rowspan=6 | 19
| rowspan=2 | Elected early in 1912.Died.
| rowspan=2 nowrap | Mar 4, 1915 –Apr 12, 1918
| rowspan=2  | Democratic
| rowspan=2 align=right | Robert F. Broussard
! rowspan=2 | 20

|- style="height:2em"
| rowspan=4 

|- style="height:2em"
|  
| nowrap | Apr 12, 1918 –Apr 22, 1918
| colspan=3 | Vacant

|- style="height:2em"
| Appointed to continue Broussard's term.Retired when elected successor qualified.
| nowrap | Apr 22, 1918 –Nov 5, 1918
|  | Democratic
| align=right | Walter Guion
! 21

|- style="height:2em"
| rowspan=2 | Elected to finish Broussard's term.Retired.
| rowspan=2 nowrap | Nov 6, 1918 –Mar 3, 1921
| rowspan=2  | Democratic
| rowspan=2 align=right | Edward James Gay
! rowspan=2 | 22

|- style="height:2em"
| rowspan=3 | Re-elected in 1918.
| rowspan=3 | 19
| 

|- style="height:2em"
| 
| rowspan=3 | 20
| rowspan=3 | Elected in 1920.
| rowspan=6 nowrap | Mar 4, 1921 –Mar 3, 1933
| rowspan=6  | Democratic
| rowspan=6 align=right |Edwin S. Broussard
! rowspan=6 | 23

|- style="height:2em"
| 

|- style="height:2em"
| rowspan=3 | Re-elected in 1924.Lost renomination.
| rowspan=3 | 20
| 

|- style="height:2em"
| 
| rowspan=3 | 21
| rowspan=3 | Re-elected in 1926.Lost renomination.

|- style="height:2em"
| 

|- style="height:2em"
! rowspan=3 | 21
| rowspan=3 align=left | Huey Long
| rowspan=3  | Democratic
| rowspan=3 nowrap | Mar 4, 1931 –Sep 10, 1935
| rowspan=3 | Elected in 1930, but continued to serve as Louisiana governor until Jan 25, 1932.Assassinated.
| rowspan=5 | 21
| 

|- style="height:2em"
| 
| rowspan=5 | 22
| rowspan=5 | Elected in 1932.
| rowspan=10 nowrap | Mar 4, 1933 –May 14, 1948
| rowspan=10  | Democratic
| rowspan=10 align=right | John Overton
! rowspan=10 | 24

|- style="height:2em"
| rowspan=3 

|- style="height:2em"
| colspan=3 | Vacant
| nowrap | Sep 10, 1935 –Jan 31, 1936
|  

|- style="height:2em"
! 22
| align=left | Rose Long
|  | Democratic
| nowrap | Jan 31, 1936 –Jan 2, 1937
| Appointed to continue her husband's term.Elected in 1936 to finish her husband's term.Retired.

|- style="height:2em"
! rowspan=21 | 23
| rowspan=21 align=left | Allen J. Ellender
| rowspan=21  | Democratic
| rowspan=21 nowrap | Jan 3, 1937 –July 27, 1972
| rowspan=3 | Elected in 1936.
| rowspan=3 | 22
| 

|- style="height:2em"
| 
| rowspan=3 | 23
| rowspan=3 | Re-elected in 1938.

|- style="height:2em"
| 

|- style="height:2em"
| rowspan=6 | Re-elected in 1942.
| rowspan=6 | 23
| 

|- style="height:2em"
| 
| rowspan=6 | 24
| rowspan=2 | Re-elected in 1944.Died.

|- style="height:2em"
| rowspan=4 

|- style="height:2em"
|  
| nowrap | May 14, 1948 –May 18, 1948
| colspan=3 | Vacant

|- style="height:2em"
| Appointed to continue Overton's term.Retired when elected successor qualified.
| nowrap | May 18, 1948 –Dec 30, 1948
|  | Democratic
| align=right | William C. Feazel
! 25

|- style="height:2em"
| rowspan=2 | Elected to finish Overton's term.
| rowspan=23 nowrap | Dec 31, 1948 –Jan 3, 1987
| rowspan=23  | Democratic
| rowspan=23 align=right | Russell Long
! rowspan=23 | 26

|- style="height:2em"
| rowspan=3 | Re-elected in 1948.
| rowspan=3 | 24
| 

|- style="height:2em"
| 
| rowspan=3 | 25
| rowspan=3 | Re-elected in 1950.

|- style="height:2em"
| 

|- style="height:2em"
| rowspan=3 | Re-elected in 1954.
| rowspan=3 | 25
| 

|- style="height:2em"
| 
| rowspan=3 | 26
| rowspan=3 | Re-elected in 1956.

|- style="height:2em"
| 

|- style="height:2em"
| rowspan=3 | Re-elected in 1960.
| rowspan=3 | 26
| 

|- style="height:2em"
| 
| rowspan=3 | 27
| rowspan=3 | Re-elected in 1962.

|- style="height:2em"
| 

|- style="height:2em"
| rowspan=3 | Re-elected in 1966.Died.
| rowspan=6 | 27
| 

|- style="height:2em"
| 
| rowspan=6 | 28
| rowspan=6 | Re-elected in 1968.

|- style="height:2em"
| rowspan=4 

|- style="height:2em"
| colspan=3 | Vacant
| nowrap | Jul 27, 1972 –Aug 1, 1972
|  

|- style="height:2em"
! 24
| align=left | Elaine Edwards
|  | Democratic
| nowrap | Aug 1, 1972 –Nov 13, 1972
| Appointed by her husband to continue Ellender's term.Retired when successor qualified and resigned early.

|- style="height:2em"
! rowspan=13 | 25
| rowspan=13 align=left | J. Bennett Johnston
| rowspan=13  | Democratic
| rowspan=13 nowrap | Nov 14, 1972 –Jan 3, 1997
| Appointed to finish Ellender's term, having already been elected to the next term.

|- style="height:2em"
| rowspan=3 | Elected in 1972.
| rowspan=3 | 28
| 

|- style="height:2em"
| 
| rowspan=3 | 29
| rowspan=3 | Re-elected in 1974.

|- style="height:2em"
| 

|- style="height:2em"
| rowspan=3 | Re-elected in 1978.
| rowspan=3 | 29
| 

|- style="height:2em"
| 
| rowspan=3 | 30
| rowspan=3 | Re-elected in 1980.Retired.

|- style="height:2em"
| 

|- style="height:2em"
| rowspan=3 | Re-elected in 1984.
| rowspan=3 | 30
| 

|- style="height:2em"
| 
| rowspan=3 | 31
| rowspan=3 | Elected in 1986.
| rowspan=9 nowrap | Jan 3, 1987 –Jan 3, 2005
| rowspan=9  | Democratic
| rowspan=9 align=right | John Breaux
! rowspan=9 | 27

|- style="height:2em"
| 

|- style="height:2em"
| rowspan=3 | Re-elected in 1990.Retired.
| rowspan=3 | 31
| 

|- style="height:2em"
| 
| rowspan=3 | 32
| rowspan=3 | Re-elected in 1992.

|- style="height:2em"
| 

|- style="height:2em"
! rowspan=9 | 26
| rowspan=9 align=left | Mary Landrieu
| rowspan=9  | Democratic
| rowspan=9 nowrap | Jan 3, 1997 –Jan 3, 2015
| rowspan=3 | Elected in 1996.
| rowspan=3 | 32
| 

|- style="height:2em"
| 
| rowspan=3 | 33
| rowspan=3 | Re-elected in 1998.Retired.

|- style="height:2em"
| 

|- style="height:2em"
| rowspan=3 | Re-elected in 2002 in runoff election.
| rowspan=3 | 33
| 

|- style="height:2em"
| 
| rowspan=3 | 34
| rowspan=3 | Elected in 2004.
| rowspan=6 nowrap | Jan 3, 2005 –Jan 3, 2017
| rowspan=6  | Republican
| rowspan=6 align=right | David Vitter
! rowspan=6 | 28

|- style="height:2em"
| 

|- style="height:2em"
| rowspan=3 | Re-elected in 2008.Lost re-election.
| rowspan=3 | 34
| 

|- style="height:2em"
| 
| rowspan=3 | 35
| rowspan=3 | Re-elected in 2010.Retired.

|- style="height:2em"
| 

|- style="height:2em"
! rowspan=6 | 27
| rowspan=6 align=left | Bill Cassidy
| rowspan=6  | Republican
| rowspan=6 nowrap | Jan 3, 2015 –Present
| rowspan=3 | Elected in 2014 in runoff election.
| rowspan=3 | 35
| 

|- style="height:2em"
| 
| rowspan=3 | 36
| rowspan=3 | Elected in 2016 in runoff election.
| rowspan=6 nowrap | Jan 3, 2017 –Present
| rowspan=6  | Republican
| rowspan=6 align=right | John Kennedy
! rowspan=6 | 29

|- style="height:2em"
| 

|- style="height:2em"
| rowspan=3 | Re-elected in 2020.
| rowspan=3 | 36
| 

|- style="height:2em"
| 
| rowspan=3 |37
| rowspan=3 | Re-elected in 2022.

|- style="height:2em"
| 

|- style="height:2em"
| rowspan=2 colspan=5 | To be determined in the 2026 election.
| rowspan=2 | 37
| 

|- style="height:2em"
| 
| 38
| colspan=5 | To be determined in the 2028 election.

See also

 List of United States representatives from Louisiana
 United States congressional delegations from Louisiana
 Elections in Louisiana

Notes

References 

 
 

 
United States Senators
Louisiana